The gwonbeon were institutions set up for the training and oversight of kisaeng and other entertainers in the early 20th century.  They were the successors of the gyobang, government-supported institutions which had provided such education and oversight in the Goryeo and Joseon dynasties.

See also
Education in Korea (disambiguation)
Gisaeng

External links
Profile of dancer Yi Mae-bang, who attended a gwonbeon in the 1930s

Korea under Japanese rule
Education in Korea
Kisaeng